Forty Reasons is the first studio album by drummer Chad Wackerman, released in 1991 through CMP Records; it was later reissued together with Wackerman's 1993 album The View as a limited edition double-disc compilation.

Critical reception

AllMusic gave Forty Reasons three stars out of five, calling it "a tidy thesis of lessons well learned, a snazzy musical diary of 20 years of modern fusion surfeited with complex drumming, a multitude of elastic-time changes, and attractive, high-tech melodies." Praise was also given to each supporting musician—guitarist Allan Holdsworth, keyboardist Jim Cox and bassist Jimmy Johnson—for their "top-notch performances".

Track listing

Personnel
Chad Wackerman – drums, production
Allan Holdsworth – guitar
Jim Cox – keyboard, piano, organ
Jimmy Johnson – bass
Walter Quintus – engineering, production
Kurt Renker – production

References

External links
In Review: Chad Wackerman "Forty Reasons" at Guitar Nine Records

Chad Wackerman albums
1991 debut albums

Albums recorded at Capitol Studios